Babasaheb Anantrao Bhosale (15 January 1921 – 6 October 2007) was an Indian politician and freedom fighter who served as Chief Minister of Maharashtra from 21 January 1982, until 1 February 1983.

Early life
Bhosale was born on 15 January 1921 in the Kaledhon Satara district of Maharashtra. An alumnus of the Shahaji Law College in Kolhapur, he passed the Bar-at-law examination at Lincoln's Inn, London in 1951 following which he practiced in Satara as an advocate for a decade. Bhosale was imprisoned during 1941–42 for his participation in the freedom struggle. After relocating to Mumbai with his 5 children, Bhosale would go on to work at the high court & hold several notable political offices in the years to come.

Electoral politics 
In 1978, Bhosale contested to and lost the Assembly election from the Nehrunagar (Vidhan Sabha constituency) in Kurla, Mumbai as a candidate of the Congress Party. In 1980, he was elected to the Maharashtra Vidhan Sabha from there and went on to become a minister and later chief minister during his first term as a Member of the Legislative Assembly. In the A R Antulay Ministry, Bhosale headed the law and judiciary portfolios before succeeding A.R Antulay as Chief Minister of Maharashtra.

Tenure as Chief Minister of Maharashtra 
Bhosale was chosen as chief minister by Prime Minister Indira Gandhi in a move that snubbed senior Maratha leaders and surprised many including Bhosale himself. Although he was Chief Minister for only 377 days, Bhosale's tenure is remembered for several bold decisions that he took. Among these were a scheme for free education for girls until matriculation, the creation of the Gadchiroli district and the inauguration of the Aurangabad bench of the Bombay High Court. Bhosale initiated several welfare measures for freedom fighters including a pension scheme for them and cracked down on a strike by policemen, dissolving the policemen's union that had the support of several senior Congress leaders. At the Vithoba Temple in Pandharpur, Bhosale's intervention led to the abolition of the system of 'Badwe' (priests) that had been a source of harassment to the devotees there. Bhosale was also well regarded for his wit & sense of humour.

Bhosale's term as Chief Minister was however also marked by dissension within the Congress Party and allegations of corruption in the distribution of liquor distilling licences and allocation of flats in Bombay. Bhosale's rule ended on 1 February 1983 following Vasantrao Patil's election to the chief ministership by legislators of the Congress Party.
 
Bhosale's cabinet had several people who went on to hold important offices later including Pratibha Patil who went on to become the President of India and Vilasrao Deshmukh who became the Chief Minister of Maharashtra.

Family 
Bhosale was the son-in-law of Tulsidas Jadhav,a freedom fighter and Rajya Sabha member who sided with Indira Gandhi when she split the Indian National Congress in 1969. His brother Shivajirao Bhosale was a vice-chancellor of Babasaheb Ambedkar Marathwada University. Bhosale's son Dilip is judicial memberof Lokpal since March 2019. His youngest son Dr. Rajan is one of India's foremost authorities & pioneers in the field of sexual medicine & sex education.

Death
Bhosale died at the Bombay Hospital in Mumbai on 6 October 2007 at the age of 86.

References

External links
Maharashtra ex-CM Babasaheb Bhosale no more

1921 births
2007 deaths
People from Satara (city)
Chief Ministers of Maharashtra
Maharashtra MLAs 1980–1985
Chief ministers from Indian National Congress
Indian National Congress politicians